The 2012 China Open was a tennis tournament played on outdoor hard courts. It was the 14th edition of the China Open for the men (16th for the women), and part of the ATP 500 Series of the 2012 ATP World Tour, and of the Premier Series of the 2012 WTA Tour. Both the men's and the women's events were held at the Olympic Green Tennis Center in Beijing, China, from 1 October till 7 October 2012. Novak Djokovic and Victoria Azarenka won the singles titles.

Points and prize money

Point distribution

Prize money

ATP singles main-draw entrants

Seeds 

 1 Rankings are as of September 24, 2012

Other entrants 
The following players received wildcards into the singles main draw:
  Marius Copil
  Wu Di
  Ze Zhang

The following players received entry from the qualifying draw:
  Brian Baker
  Michael Berrer
  Alex Bogomolov Jr.
  Matthew Ebden

Withdrawals 
  Santiago Giraldo
  Marcel Granollers
  John Isner
  Rafael Nadal

Retirements 
  Julien Benneteau
  Nikolay Davydenko
  David Ferrer (stomach virus)
  Feliciano López

ATP doubles main-draw entrants

Seeds

 Rankings are as of September 24, 2012

Other entrants
The following pairs received wildcards into the doubles main draw:
  Yu Chang /  Zhe Li
  Maoxin Gong /  Zhang Ze
The following pair received entry as alternates:
  Carlos Berlocq /  Denis Istomin

Withdrawals
  Julien Benneteau
  Marin Čilić (right hip injury)

WTA singles main-draw entrants

Seeds 

 1 Rankings are as of September 24, 2012

Other entrants 
The following players received wildcards into the singles main draw:
  Kimiko Date-Krumm
  María-Teresa Torró-Flor
  Wang Qiang
  Zheng Saisai
  Zhang Shuai

The following players received entry from the qualifying draw:
  Lara Arruabarrena Vecino
  Lourdes Domínguez Lino
  Camila Giorgi
  Polona Hercog
  Bojana Jovanovski
  Ayumi Morita
  Laura Robson
  Elena Vesnina

The following player received entry as lucky loser:
  Olga Govortsova

Withdrawals 
  Kaia Kanepi (right heel injury)
  Flavia Pennetta (right wrist injury)
  Sloane Stephens
  Serena Williams (illness)
  Venus Williams (back injury)
  Vera Zvonareva (illness)

Retirements 
  Dominika Cibulková (left hip injury)
  Sara Errani (left thigh injury)
  Angelique Kerber (right foot injury)
  Anastasia Pavlyuchenkova (gastrointestinal illness)

WTA doubles main-draw entrants

Seeds

1 Rankings are as of September 24, 2012

Other entrants
The following pairs received wildcards into the doubles main draw:
  Tang Haochen /  Tian Ran
  Jelena Janković /  Andrea Petkovic
  Yan Zi /  Zheng Saisai
The following pairs received entry as alternates:
  Catalina Castaño /  Virginie Razzano
  Liu Wanting /  Sun Shengnan

Withdrawals
  Sara Errani (left thigh injury)
  Anastasia Pavlyuchenkova (gastrointestinal illness)

Finals

Men's singles 

 Novak Djokovic defeated  Jo-Wilfried Tsonga, 7–6(7–4), 6–2

Women's singles 

 Victoria Azarenka defeated  Maria Sharapova, 6–3, 6–1

Men's doubles 

 Bob Bryan /  Mike Bryan defeated  Carlos Berlocq /  Denis Istomin, 6–3, 6–2

Women's doubles 

  Ekaterina Makarova /  Elena Vesnina defeated  Nuria Llagostera Vives /  Sania Mirza, 7–5, 7–5

References

External links 
 Official website